Vasilyovo is a rural locality (a village) in Kubenskoye Rural Settlement, Vologodsky District, Vologda Oblast, Russia. The population was 14 as of 2002.

Geography 
Vasilyovo is located 55 km northwest of Vologda (the district's administrative centre) by road. Doronkino is the nearest rural locality.

References 

Rural localities in Vologodsky District